Tarek Ben Chrouda (born 13 October 1976) is a Tunisian former footballer. He competed in the men's tournament at the 1996 Summer Olympics.

References

External links
 
 

1976 births
Living people
Tunisian footballers
Tunisia international footballers
Olympic footballers of Tunisia
Footballers at the 1996 Summer Olympics
Place of birth missing (living people)
Association football midfielders
AS Marsa players
Club Africain players